Antiochus is a 1721 tragedy by the British writer John Mottley. The play is set in Ancient Greece, revolving round the relationship between Stratonice of Syria and Seleucus I Nicator and his son Antiochus I Soter, the leaders of the Seleucid Empire.

The original Lincoln's Inn Fields cast included James Quin as Selecus, Lacy Ryan as Antiochus, John Egleton as Arsaces, Richard Diggs as Cleartes, Anthony Boheme as Nicanor, Elizabeth Spiller as Semandra and Anna Maria Seymour as Stratonice.

References

Bibliography
 Baines, Paul & Ferarro, Julian & Rogers, Pat. The Wiley-Blackwell Encyclopedia of Eighteenth-Century Writers and Writing, 1660-1789. Wiley-Blackwell, 2011.
 Burling, William J. A Checklist of New Plays and Entertainments on the London Stage, 1700-1737. Fairleigh Dickinson Univ Press, 1992.

1721 plays
West End plays
Plays by John Mottley
Tragedy plays
Plays set in ancient Greece
Cultural depictions of kings
Cultural depictions of Greek men
Plays based on real people
Plays set in the 3rd century BC